Mount Kukak is an almost completely ice-covered stratovolcano on the Alaska Peninsula of Alaska, United States. Although the last eruption from Mount Kukak is unknown, it displays vigorous fumarolic activity.

References

Volcanoes of Lake and Peninsula Borough, Alaska
Mountains of Lake and Peninsula Borough, Alaska
Stratovolcanoes of the United States
Volcanoes of Alaska
Mountains of Alaska